Change the NZ Flag was a group campaigning for New Zealanders to change the national flag of New Zealand. The group described itself as "an independent, non-political, design-neutral society that is committed to building support for, and involvement with, the flag change process."

Originally founded by Wellington businessman Lloyd Morrison as the NZ Flag.com Trust, the group reformed in 2015 as "New Flag New Zealand Incorporated" to campaign in the referendums on the issue. New Flag New Zealand Incorporated was dissolved in 2018. The group was affiliated with Ausflag, a trust promoting a redesign of the flag of Australia.

History
The group was originally the NZ Flag.com Trust, established in 2003 by Wellington businessman Lloyd Morrison with the goal of bringing about a referendum on the issue under the Citizens Initiated Referendum Act 1993. The Trust was a non-profit charitable trust and relied on donations and proceeds from the sale of merchandise to fund its operation.

Petition to change flag
In January 2005, the Trust launched a petition to bring about a citizens' initiated referendum on the issue. Had it been successful, a referendum would have been held at the 2005 general election. However, the Trust failed to attract enough signatures, and six months after its launch, the petition had been signed by 100,000 people (the signatures of 270,000 – 10 per cent of eligible voters – were required to trigger a referendum). After Telecom New Zealand and New Zealand Post reneged on an offer to distribute the petition nationwide, the Trust withdrew the petition.

Lloyd Morrison attributed the failure to apathy from the general public, while supporters of New Zealand's current flag attributed the petition's failure to the popularity of that flag.

Flag referendums 

In 2014, Prime Minister John Key announced his intention to hold a referendum on New Zealand's flag. In May 2015, the group launched a campaign in support of changing the flag. With the NZ Flag.com Trust dissolved, a new group, New Flag New Zealand Incorporated, with many of the same members, was formed.

Following the failure of the flag referendum, Change the NZ Flag was wound-up and its web domain and Facebook page were taken over by New Zealand Republic, also led by Lewis Holden.

See also
 New Zealand flag debate
 Silver fern flag
 New Zealand Flag Institute

References

External links
  (NZ Flag.com older website)

Organizations established in 2003
New Zealand culture
Political groupings in New Zealand
2003 establishments in New Zealand